Najeeb Tarakai (2 February 19916 October 2020) was an Afghan cricketer who played international cricket for the Afghanistan team. He played in twelve Twenty20 International matches and a One Day International fixture. Tarakai made his international debut at the 2014 ICC World Twenty20 tournament in Bangladesh. In domestic cricket, he scored more than 2,000 runs in first-class matches. He was also part of the Afghan team that won the silver medal in the cricket tournament at the 2014 Asian Games.

Domestic career
Tarakai made his Twenty20 debut for the Afghan Cheetahs in the Faysal Bank Twenty-20 Cup against Rawalpindi Rams. He played in the Cheetahs two other fixtures in that competition, against Faisalabad Wolves and Multan Tigers. In these three matches, he scored a total of 54 runs at an average of 18.00, with a high score of 34. In September 2018, he was named in Nangarhar's squad in the first edition of the Afghanistan Premier League tournament.

He was the leading run-scorer for Speen Ghar Region in the 2018 Ahmad Shah Abdali 4-day Tournament, with 719 runs in ten matches. He was also the leading run-scorer in the 2019 Ahmad Shah Abdali 4-day Tournament, with 670 runs in five matches, including four centuries in successive games.

International career
He made his debut against Bangladesh in the 2014 ICC World Twenty20 tournament. He played two Twenty20 International (T20I) matches for Afghanistan in 2014.

On 10 March 2017 against Ireland, Tarakai scored 90 runs during the second T20I at Greater Noida. His match-winning performance along with the bowling performance by Rashid Khan, brought him his maiden man of the match award.

He made his One Day International (ODI) debut for Afghanistan against Ireland at the Greater Noida Sports Complex Ground on 24 March 2017.

Death
On 2 October 2020, Tarakai sustained a severe head injury after being hit by a car while crossing a road in Jalalabad. He was taken to a nearby hospital in Nangarhar and subsequently underwent surgery while in a coma. He died four days later on 6 October 2020, with his death being confirmed by the Afghanistan Cricket Board.

References

External links
 

1991 births
2020 deaths
Afghan cricketers
Afghan Cheetahs cricketers
Afghanistan One Day International cricketers
Afghanistan Twenty20 International cricketers
Place of birth missing
Asian Games medalists in cricket
Cricketers at the 2014 Asian Games
Boost Defenders cricketers
Asian Games silver medalists for Afghanistan
Medalists at the 2014 Asian Games
Nangarhar Leopards cricketers
Pedestrian road incident deaths
Road incident deaths in Afghanistan
Amo Sharks cricketers
Spin Ghar Tigers cricketers